Bebidja is an area of Chad. It has large oil reserves and has such been of interest to foreign oil companies such as ExxonMobil, Shell and Elf.

References

places
Geography of Chad